The 1998 EHF European Women's Handball Championship was held in the Netherlands from 11 to 20 December. It was won by Norway after beating Denmark 24–16 in the final match.

Venues
The tournament was held in the following cities:
Amsterdam
's-Hertogenbosch

Qualification

Note: Bold indicates champion for that year. Italic indicates host for that year.

Squads

Preliminary round

Group A

Group B

Final round

Bracket

Eleventh place game

Ninth place game

Seventh place game

Fifth place game

Semifinals

Third place game

Final

Ranking and Statistics

Final ranking

Source: EuroHandball.com.

All Star Team

Source: EHF

References

European Women's Handball Championship
H
H
Women's handball in the Netherlands
European Women's Handball Championship
December 1998 sports events in Europe
Sports competitions in 's-Hertogenbosch
European Women's Handball Championship, 1998
1990s in Amsterdam